Umaro is a Guinea-Bissau given name.

Umaro Sissoco Embaló
Umaro, Characters of Final Fantasy VI#Umaro